Oscar Fetrás (16 February 1854 – 10 January 1931) was a German composer of popular dance music, military marches, piano pieces and arrangements.

Fetrás had over 200 compositions to his name. His best known work is his waltz "Mondnacht auf der Alster" Op. 60 which is still immensely popular to the present day.

Biography

Fetrás was born as Otto Kaufmann Faster in 1854 in Hamburg. His father Matthias Faster was an Hamburgian editor of a stock-exchange magazine. The Faster family originally came from Bützfleth, a locality of today's Stade near Hamburg. Fetrás's grandfather, a sea captain, died in the sinking of his ship Ceres. His mother Amalie Margarethe, born Decker, had ancestral origins from the island of Sylt.

Once he became widely regarded as being on the same level as the revered Viennese waltz kings, he departed to conduct his own orchestra. At the age of 26 Fetrás's compositions attracted the attention of a Hamburg publisher. He changed his name to Fetrás, an anagram of his surname Faster.

Fetrás soon rose to the position of conductor of the Uhlenhorster Fährhaus, a famous restaurant with ballrooms in Hamburg for which he composed his second most famous, but now forgotten work, Uhlenhorster Kinder. He was regarded as the most talented light music composer that Northern Germany ever produced and from the start modelled his own composing on that of his idol, Johann Strauss Jr. As a gift of thanks for his waltz "Mondnacht auf der Alster" which brought Hamburg international acclaim, the local business community gave Fetrás a bronze statue of the Roman god Hermes/Mercurius by the French artist Marius Montagne. This statue is the only remaining possession of Fetrás which survived the World War II bombings and is now owned privately in Henstedt-Ulzburg near Hamburg.

It might have been Franz von Blon, at that time the conductor of the Stadttheater Orchestra, who introduced "Mondnacht auf der Alster" at the inaugural concert for the 1888 ball season. It was a sensation and earned Fetrás the title of "The Hamburg Waltz King". Soon he was invited to tour Germany, Austria and France with his orchestra. He became personally acquainted with Johann Strauss. In 1904 he won a prize for his composition "Frühlingsluft" and later he wrote Reiche Mädchen, a reworking of Johann Strauss's 1897 operetta Die Göttin der Vernunft. The complete Die Göttin der Vernunft operetta has been released in 2011 by Naxos Records, whilst the Reiche Mädchen has been recorded by Marco Polo on their two CD production of Johann Strauss operetta collections. Fetrás remained well-known and respected and though definitely a second rank composer in the Viennese style, he produced some 300 works. Fetrás died January 1931 in Hamburg and was buried in the Ohlsdorf Cemetery.

Legacy

In 1943, the Uhlenhorster Färhaus was destroyed by Allied bombing, and with it was lost the original score of Fetrás's most famous work "Mondnacht auf der Alster". The waltzes and music of Fetrás appear to have disappeared from the mainstream repertoire since then. This was primarily due to the many outlets of music publishers and music parts libraries which issued his material being destroyed during the bombing of Hamburg in World War II, leaving no publishers to issue his material to this day. Arrangements for solo piano of all of his works, published with opus numbers, are available on IMSLP.

In Hamburg-Rahlstedt the street Fetrasweg is named after him.

Works
 Op. 10 Goldschmieds Töchterlein – waltz
 Op. 11 Bankett – march
 Op. 12 Schönes Lenchen – polka française
 Op. 13 Hand in Hand – lanciers
 Op. 14 Lustig voran! – march
 Op. 15 in der gold'nen Faschingszeit – waltz
 Op. 16 Traulich beisammen – gavotte
 Op. 17 Fruhling im Herzen – waltz
 Op. 18 Ihm nach! – polka schnell
 Op. 19 Luftschlösser – waltz
 Op. 20 Flottes Carré – lanciers
 Op. 21 Rosamundchen – polka française
 Op. 22 Carmen – waltz after motives from Bizet's opera
 Op. 23 Nachtschwärmer – waltz
 Op. 24 An die Gewehre! – march
 Op. 25 Die Schäferin – rheinische polka
 Op. 26 Das blonde Gretchen – waltz
 Op. 27 Maskentrubel – polka française
 Op. 28 Elekrisch – polka schnell
 Op. 29 Balduin Dahl-march – march
 Op. 30 La mascotte – waltz after motives from Audran's opera
 Op. 31 Im Morgengrauen – waltz
 Op. 32 Le Petit blue – march
 Op. 33 Vis a Vis – lanciers
 Op. 34 Rip-Rip Valse – waltz after motives from Robert Planquette
 Op. 35 Spanischer – waltz
 Op. 36 Blumenpyramiden – waltz
 Op. 37 Wintergarten – quadrille
 Op. 38 Zigeunerblut – march
 Op. 39 Kostümfest – quadrille
 Op. 40 Uhlenhorster Kinder – waltz
 Op. 41 Nur fest! – march
 Op. 42 Irma – waltz after motives from Audran's opera
 Op. 43 Fensterpromenaden – waltz
 Op. 44 Dunkle Rose – polka-mazurka
 Op. 45 Dir zu Lieb! – polka française
 Op. 47 Tosti-Leider – waltz
 Op. 48 Husarenliebchen – march-polka
 Op. 49 Derby – quadrille
 Op. 50 Veilchen am Wege – waltz
 Op. 51 Frisch gewagt – march
 Op. 52 Bei Nacht und Nebel – waltz
 Op. 53 Emmeline – polka française
 Op. 54 Stelldichein – march
 Op. 55 Lieb und Lied – waltz
 Op. 57 Jeanette – polka française
 Op. 58 Barcelona – march
 Op. 59 Erwischt! – polka schnell
 Op. 60 Mondnacht auf der Alster – waltz
 Op. 61 Bunte Reihe – lanciers
 Op. 62 Train – march
 Op. 63 Marias Traum – waltz
 Op. 64 Quadrille im Militärstil – quadrille
 Op. 65 Fifi – March
 Op. 66 En tete a tete – lanciers
 Op. 67 Trinket, scherzet! – waltz
 Op. 68 Margaretha – polka-mazurka
 Op. 69 Maskenscherze – quadrille
 Op. 70 Auf rosigem Pfad – waltz
 Op. 71 Geschichten aus dem Sachsenwald – waltz
 Op. 72 Leichtes Element – polka française
 Op. 73 Nervös – polka schnell
 Op. 74 Schalagat – quadrille
 Op. 75 Blaue Augen – blauer Himmel – waltz
 Op. 76 Wissmann – march
 Op. 77 Eichhörnchen – polka schnell
 Op. 78 Der Gladiator – march
 Op. 79 Spielmanns Lieder – waltz
 Op. 80 Strand-Idyllen – waltz
 Op. 82 Dimitri – march
 Op. 83 Fidele – march
 Op. 93 Harvestehuder Schwalben - waltz
 Op. 112 Märchen aus der Quellental – waltz
 Op. 122 Die Königsmaid – waltz
 Op. 126 Redaktionsgeheinmisse – waltz
 Op. 128 La Barcarolle – waltz after motives from Jacques Offenbach's opera
 Op. 137 Carmen – march after motives from Bizet
 Op. 139 Tirol in Lied und Tanz
 Op. 140 Carmen – quadrille after motives from Bizet's opera
 Op. 145 Prisca – waltz (Rupprecht)
 Op. 146 Funkensprache – polka schnell
 Op. 147 Flunkermichel – polka française
 Op. 148 Scheiden und Meiden (Les Adieux) – waltz
 Op. 149 Sommernacht am Rhein – waltz
 Op. 150 Frohsinn auf den Bergen – waltz
 Op. 152 Im 7 Himmel – potpourri
 Op. 153 Liebe schafft Rat – overture
 Op. 154 Freikugeln – march
 Op. 157 Melodien-Parade – march-potpourri
 Op. 163 Offenbach – quadrille after motives from Jacques Offenbach
 Op. 164 Offenbach – waltz
 Op. 165 Wenn die Füsschen sie heben – waltz after motives from Die keusche Susanne von Jean Gilbert
 Op. 166 Wenn der Vater mit dem Sohne –  march after motives from Die keusche Susanne von Jean Gilbert
 Op. 167 Hahnen-Rheinländer (Die keusche Susanne – Gilbert) / Kätchen-Rheinländer (Tieck) – polka française
 Op. 168 Die keusche Susanne – potpourri (Gilbert)
 Op. 169 Onegin-Klänge – waltz after motives from Tchaikovsky's opera
 Op. 170 Margueritentag – waltz
 Op. 171 Operetten-Revue – potpourri
 Op. 174 Willst du Liebe lernen? – waltz after motives from Marine-Gust'l von Georg Jarno
 Op. 175 Spanisch-Polnisch – march
 Op. 176 Auf hoher See – march after motives from Marine-Gust'l von Jarno
 Op. 177 Die keusche Susanne – quadrille after motives from Die keusche Susanne von Jean Gilbert
 Op. 178 Die Marine-Gust'l – potpourri (Georg Jarno)
 Op. 179 Truthahn-Tanz – trot de dindon
 Op. 180 Blumenfest – overture
 Op. 188 Skizzen aus Russland – divertissement
 Op. 189 Die Wandervögel – march
 Op. 191 Polo-Spiele – intermezzo
 Op. 192 Mia Cara – tango
 Op. 193 Walzerflut oder 100 Jahre in 15 Minuten – chronological waltz-suite
 Op. 194 Die lustigen Marionetten – intermezzo
 Op. 195 Juchhei, Tirolerbub – march
 Op. 196 Souvenir de Chopin – fantasie
 Op. 197 Froh im Kreise – Deutsches Volkslieder Potpourri
 Op. 199 O Deutschland hoch in Ehren – march
 Op. 200 Hurra Hurra die Ulanen sind da – war March 1914
 Op. 201 Hindenburg – march
 Op. 202 Kinderlieder – march
 Op. 203 Verkaufte Braut – march after motives from Smetana's opera
 Op. 204 Andreas Hofer – march
 Op. 205 Nachruf an Schubert – potpourri
 Op. 206 Nachruf an Mendelssohn – potpourri
 Op. 207 Alpensänger – potpourri
 Op. 208 Holzschuh -Tanz – Charakterstück – potpourri
 Op. 209 Künstlerlaune – intermezzo
 Op. 210 Hoffnungssterne – waltz
 Op. 211 Von Bühne zu Bühne – opera fantasie
 Op. 212 Erinnerung an Josef Gung'l – potpourri
 Op. 213 Aus Deutschlands Liederhain – potpourri
 Op. 215 Lumbye-Fantasie – divertissement (Hans Christian Lumbye)
 Op. 216 Nymphe und Faun – waltz after motives from Léo Delibes
 Op. 218 Minutenspiele – potpourri
 Op. 219 Sang und Tanz vom Böhmerland – potpourri
 Op. 222 Russische Volksklänge – potpourri
 Op. 223 Tanzlust auf der Alm – Ländler

In popular culture
"Moonlight on the Alster" is described as being popular with Royal Navy personnel in the novel HMS Ulysses by Alistair MacLean.

Sources and references 
 Lexikon des Blasmusikwesens, Freiburg-Tiengen: Blasmusikverlag Schulz, 1988
 La musica en la radio: radio Ciudad Real EAJ 65 y sus discos de pizarra Coordinador: Francisco Alía Miranda Cuenca: Ediciones de la Universidad de Castilla-La Mancha, 2000, p. 321–356
 The heritage encyclopedia of band music: composers and their music Edited by Paul E. Bierley. William H. Rehrig, Westerville, Ohio: Integrity Press, 1991
 The New Grove Dictionary of Music and Musicians London: Macmillan, 1980
 Kurschners Deutscher Musiker-Kalender 1954 Zweite Ausgabe des Deutschen Musiker-Lexikons erausgeber: Hedwig und E.H. Mueller von Asow, Berlin: Walter de Gruyter, 1954
 Sohlman's musiklexikon Gosta Morin, Carl Allan Moberg. Einar Sundstrom Stockholm: Sohlman Forlag, 1951
 Dizionario universale dei musicisti: Supplemento Schmidl, Carlo. Milan: Sonzogno, 1938
 Kurzgefasstes Tonkünstler Lexikon: fur Musiker und Freunde der Musik Begründet von Paul Frank. Neu bearbeitet und erganzt von Wilhelm Altmann. Regensburg: Gustave Bosse, 1936
 Deutsches Musiker-Lexikon Herausgegeben von Erich H. Muller. Dresden: Wilhelm Limpert, 1929

References

External links
Oscar Fetrás' biography, Johann Strauss Society of Great Britain
Oscar Festras biography, Hamburg Stadtwiki

1854 births
1931 deaths
19th-century classical composers
20th-century classical composers
Light music composers
Musicians from Hamburg
German Romantic composers
German male classical composers
20th-century German composers
19th-century German composers
20th-century German male musicians
19th-century German male musicians